Gambling Daughters is a 1941 American mystery film directed by Max Nosseck and starring Cecilia Parker, Roger Pryor and Robert Baldwin.

Plot Summary
Lillian and Katherine discover a gambling spot while following their French teacher, then Lillian falls for Chance the manager working there. The girls are induced to play on credit, and after a couple of weeks and a couple thousand dollars in debt, they are forced to steal jewellery from their families.

Cast
 Cecilia Parker as Diana Cameron  
 Roger Pryor as Chance Landon  
 Robert Baldwin as Jimmy Parker  
 Gale Storm as Lillian Harding  
 Sig Arno as Prof. Bedoin  
 Janet Shaw as Katherine Thompson  
 Charles Miller as Walter Cameron 
 Eddie Foster as Nick  
 Alfred Hall as Dean  
 Judy Kilgore as Gloria  
 Gertrude Messinger as Jane  
 Marvelle Andre as Dorothy  
 Roberta Smith as Mary

References

Bibliography
 Langman, Larry. Destination Hollywood: The Influence of Europeans on American Filmmaking. McFarland, 2000.

External links

1941 films
American mystery films
1941 mystery films
1940s English-language films
Films directed by Max Nosseck
Films about gambling
Producers Releasing Corporation films
American black-and-white films
1940s American films